Kwame Governs Agbodza is a Ghanaian politician and member of the Seventh Parliament of the Fourth Republic of Ghana representing the Adaklu Constituency in the Volta Region on the ticket of the National Democratic Congress. He is currently the Chief Whip in the Parliament of Ghana.

Early life and education 
Kwame Governs was born on 22 September 1973 at Adaklu Kordiabe in the Volta region of Ghana. He then had his postgraduate Diploma in architecture at University of Westminster, proceeded to have his Diploma in architecture at university of East London. He then returned to Ghana to have his Bachelor of Science degree in architecture at kwame Nkrumah University of science and technology . He attended Royal institute of British Architects to attain his chartered architecture certificate and also got another chartered architecture certificate from Ghana institute of Architect.

Career 
Kwame Governs is managing director of southworld technical services from 1999 to date, he is the  chief executive officer at Architects Co partners from 2010 to date and also chief executive officer at kay and partners from 2012 to date.

Personal life 
He is identified as a Christian and he is married with two children .

Political 
Kwame Governs won the seat by 11,825 votes out of 13,440 valid cast votes which was equivalent to 87.98%. He was then elected by Parliament to join the Roads and transportation committee and members holding offices of profits committee .

References 

1973 births
Living people
National Democratic Congress (Ghana) politicians
Ghanaian MPs 2013–2017
Ghanaian MPs 2017–2021
Ghanaian MPs 2021–2025
Kwame Nkrumah University of Science and Technology alumni
Ghanaian architects